Accelerated Evolution is the sixth studio album by Canadian musician Devin Townsend, released in 2003. The album, written and produced by Townsend, was a mix of musical styles from alternative rock to hard rock to progressive metal. Townsend, the lead vocalist and guitarist, assembled a group of Vancouver musicians to perform with him on the album: guitarist Brian Waddell, drummer Ryan Van Poederooyen, bassist Mike Young, and keyboardist Dave Young. This lineup, the Devin Townsend Band, was Townsend's first dedicated lineup for his solo material, and was created as a counterpart to Townsend's extreme metal project Strapping Young Lad.

Accelerated Evolution was written and recorded at the same time as Strapping Young Lad's self-titled album, with Townsend dividing his energy between the two. Accelerated Evolution was recorded in Vancouver, British Columbia from September to November 2002, and was released on Townsend's independent label, HevyDevy Records, in March 2003. The album was well received by critics for its blend of genres and influences, its musical accessibility, and its large-scale rock production style.

Background
During the creation of his early solo albums Infinity (1998) and Physicist (2000), Devin Townsend went through personal struggles that affected his writing ability. These struggles were resolved on Terria (2001), which Townsend described as "a really healing record". After Terria, Townsend felt a newfound enthusiasm for his music, saying, "Bring it on. I'm going to be so fucking sensitive but so intense, and be unafraid to be either." In 2002, Townsend began work on his next two albums. He reunited his extreme metal project Strapping Young Lad, which had been on hiatus for four years, and began writing the band's new release, Strapping Young Lad (SYL).

At the same time, Townsend formed a new, permanent band "on par with Strapping" to record and tour for his solo releases. The Devin Townsend Band consisted of Brian Waddell on guitar, Ryan Van Poederooyen on drums, and brothers Mike Young and Dave Young on bass and keyboards, respectively. Townsend performed guitar, vocals, and production, as he did in Strapping Young Lad. Townsend chose members of local bands who "hadn't had the same experiences" and could give a fresh perspective on "all those emotions" that were present in his solo material. He found it "refreshing" to play with people who appreciated his solo material more than Strapping Young Lad's. Notable was the absence of drummer Gene Hoglan of Strapping Young Lad, who had played on Townsend's previous three solo albums.

Townsend wrote and produced the band's first album at the same time he was working on SYL, spending half the week on one and half on the other. The album was engineered and mixed by Townsend and Shaun Thingvold, who has worked on many of Townsend's and Strapping Young Lad's albums. It had the working title Relationships, but was renamed Accelerated Evolution, a nod to the frantic pace of putting a new band together in under a year.

Music
Accelerated Evolution was written as "the polar opposite" of SYL. The album blended aspects of different genres, including alternative rock, hard rock, and progressive metal, with elements of "heaviness, ambience, humor, and experimentalism". The album has been described as more melodic and more rock-based than SYL or Physicist, yet "more song-oriented" than Terria, with influences by John Lennon, Jimi Hendrix, and Rush. Songs such as "Storm", "Suicide", and "Sunday Afternoon" were compared to Townsend's Infinity, but were noted as "less frantic and more mature"; Despite this, "Deadhead" derived its name from an extreme industrial metal track with the same title from Godflesh's 1989 album Streetcleaner. Townsend wrote the album to be "commercially viable", making his existing style more concise and accessible but without going so far as to write "pop songs". Townsend utilized clean vocals much more than in his previous albums, and produced and mixed the album in his trademark "wall of sound" style, blending "layers upon layers of guitars, keyboards, and vocals".

Release
Accelerated Evolution was released in March 2003 on Townsend's independent label, HevyDevy Records. It is distributed in Canada by HevyDevy, in Japan by Sony, and in Europe and North America by InsideOut. The album art was created by Travis Smith, who also did the art for Terria and SYL. InsideOut also released a special edition of the album which contained a 3-track EP called Project EKO, Townsend's first foray into electronica. The album reached number 135 on the French albums chart and number 249 on the Japanese albums chart.

Prior to the formation of the Devin Townsend Band, Townsend had represented his solo releases live with the Strapping Young Lad lineup; the band would play one set of Strapping Young Lad songs and one set of Devin Townsend songs. After the release of Accelerated Evolution, Townsend began touring with The Devin Townsend Band, at times separately from Strapping Young Lad and at times sharing the bill. After playing two release shows in Vancouver in July 2003, The Devin Townsend Band toured Canada with Strapping Young Lad and Zimmers Hole in October 2003. This was followed by a North American tour with progressive metal band Symphony X through November and December 2003.

Critical reception

Accelerated Evolution was well received by critics. Mike G. of Metal Maniacs called Accelerated Evolution "the album of the year", praising it for "the hard-to-accomplish trick of being extreme yet accessible, simultaneously heavy 'n' rockin' yet majestic and beautiful." William Hughes of Sputnikmusic called it "amazing", saying the album "has elements that will appeal to fans of all different genres, from progressive to metal." Alex Henderson of Allmusic called the album "excellent", and praised Townsend's ability to blend genres and influences: "The Canadian rocker provides enough downtuned guitars to put this CD in the alt rock category. And yet Accelerated Evolution has a big sound that suggests the pop-metal, arena rock and hard rock of the '70s and '80s – big melodies, big harmonies, big guitars, big vocals, big production." Chris Hawkins of KNAC.com said, "Like always, what Devin manages to do is take the most infectious rhythm, place his stamp upon it, and thus create something completely original." Xander Hoose of Chronicles of Chaos compared the album favorably to SYL, noting that "there is more variation, and the songs are more memorable and layered than their one-dimensional SYL counterparts." Hoose added, "For those who thought Terria was going too much in the wrong direction, Accelerated Evolution will probably come as a relief."

Track listing

Inside Out Music's special edition of Accelerated Evolution included Project EKO, an electronica EP by Townsend.

Personnel
 Devin Townsend – guitar, vocals, ambience
 Ryan Van Poederooyen – drums
 Mike Young – bass
 Brian Waddell – guitar
 Dave Young – keyboards

Production
 Devin Townsend – production, audio engineering, mixing
 Shaun Thingvold – engineering, mixing
 Goran Finnberg – mastering
 Misha Rajaratnam, Dan Kearley, Carla Levis, Scott Cooke, Jay Van Poederooyen, Lori Bridger, Chris Guy – assistance

Artwork
 Omer Cordell – photography (credited as Omer Shaked)
 Travis Smith – graphics, layout

Charts

References

External links
 Accelerated Evolution (HevyDevy Records)
 Accelerated Evolution (InsideOut Music)

2003 albums
Devin Townsend albums
Inside Out Music albums
Albums produced by Devin Townsend
Albums with cover art by Travis Smith (artist)